Vivian Okwach (born 9 February 1999) is a Kenyan rugby sevens player. She competed in the 2020 Summer Olympics as part of the Kenyan team that qualified for the Olympics after South Africa declined their spot.

References

1999 births
Living people
Rugby sevens players at the 2020 Summer Olympics
Kenyan rugby sevens players
Olympic rugby sevens players of Kenya
Kenya international women's rugby sevens players